George Chrisman House is a historic home located near Linville, Rockingham County, Virginia. It was built between 1761 and 1787, and is a two-story, three bay, limestone Federal style dwelling with flanking wings. The wings are an original -story kitchen wing to the west and a one-story east wing built from limestone taken from the ruins of Shaver Mill about 1960.  Also on the property are the ruins of Shaver Mill, built about 1830.

It was listed on the National Register of Historic Places in 2006.

References

Houses on the National Register of Historic Places in Virginia
Federal architecture in Virginia
Houses completed in 1787
Houses in Rockingham County, Virginia
National Register of Historic Places in Rockingham County, Virginia
1787 establishments in Virginia